Elections to the Volksraad were held in the Dutch East Indies in 1931.

Electoral system
The Volksraad had a total of 60 members, 38 of which were elected and 22 appointed. Seats were also assigned to ethnic groups, with 25 for the Dutch population (15 elected, 10 appointed), 30 for the native population (20 elected, 10 appointed) and five for the Chinese population (3 elected, 2 appointed).

Results

References

1931 elections in Asia
1931
1931 in the Dutch East Indies